The Current 78 is a progressive political party in Uruguay. It is a member organisation of the ruling Broad Front Progressive Encounter-New Majority.

Broad Front (Uruguay)
Political party factions in Uruguay
Political parties in Uruguay
Political parties with year of establishment missing
Progressive parties